Xu Xu (born 13 January 1998) is a Chinese former footballer who played as a midfielder, winger, or forward.

Career
Born in Shehong, Suining, Sichuan, Xu started his career at the age of seven with Shandong Luneng, who he captained at youth level. In 2013, Xu trialed for the youth academy of Barcelona, Spain's most successful club, after receiving an offer to join the youth academy of Metz in France, where his father said, "I feel that these Barcelona U17 players are also playing average, and few are better than my kids". Having failed to get into Barcelona's academy, he instead joined Terrassa. This spell was short-lived, as he joined Cornellà at the age of fifteen.

In 2016, he became the first Chinese player to sign for Espanyol, but stayed for less than a year before joining Sant Andreu. In February 2017, he joined Granada, and was loaned to Chinese Super League side Chongqing Liangjiang Athletic, where he did not make an appearance.

He returned to Granada, but moved back to China to sign for Shaanxi Chang'an Athletic in the Chinese third division, helping them achieve promotion to the Chinese second division.

He retired in 2022, following his release by Shaanxi Chang'an Athletic.

References

External links

Living people
1998 births
People from Suining
Footballers from Sichuan
Chinese footballers
China youth international footballers
Association football wingers
Association football midfielders
Association football forwards
China League Two players
China League One players
Shandong Taishan F.C. players
UE Cornellà players
RCD Espanyol footballers
UE Sant Andreu footballers
Granada CF footballers
Chongqing Liangjiang Athletic F.C. players
Shaanxi Chang'an Athletic F.C. players
Chinese expatriate footballers
Chinese expatriate sportspeople in Spain
Expatriate footballers in Spain
21st-century Chinese people